Richard Priestley Lifton (born 1953) is an American biochemist and the 11th and current president of The Rockefeller University. He earned his B.A. in biological sciences from Dartmouth College and in 1986 he got his M.D. and Ph.D. in biochemistry from Stanford University. He trained at Brigham and Women's Hospital before starting his lab at Yale in 1993.  He has been awarded the Wiley Prize in Biomedical Sciences for his discovery of genes that are associated with the regulation of blood pressure.  In 2014 he was awarded the $3 million Breakthrough Prize in Life Sciences for his work.  He has been a Howard Hughes Medical Institute (HHMI) investigator since 1994. He was inducted into the National Academy of Sciences and Institute of Medicine, and he is a Fellow of the American Association for the Advancement of Science.

In May 2016, Lifton was named the president of Rockefeller University. He succeeded Marc Tessier-Lavigne.

See also
Physician-scientist

External links
HHMI bio
faculty bio

References

American biochemists
1953 births
Howard Hughes Medical Investigators
Members of the United States National Academy of Sciences
Presidents of Rockefeller University
Yale School of Medicine faculty
Yale Sterling Professors
Living people
Physician-scientists
Members of the National Academy of Medicine